Institute of Automation and Electrometry of the Siberian Branch of the RAS is a research institute of Novosibirsk, Russia. It was founded in 1957.

The institute is among the first research institutes organized in Akademgorodok.

Scientific activity
Initially, the scientific activity of the Institute was associated with automatic measuring devices and systems for collection of information and date processing.

The institute conducts research in the field of optics, spectroscopy, condensed matter physics, it is exploring degenerate Bose–Einstein condensates of rarefied gases. The scientific organization develops precision optical technology, computing systems etc.

Collaboration
The Institute cooperates with Rzhanov Institute of Semiconductor Physics, Institute of Laser Physics and Novosibirsk State University in the field of physics of ultracold atoms.

Leaders
 Boris Karandeyev (1957–1967), the founder and the first director of the institute.
 Yuri Nesterikhin (1967–1987)
 Pyotr Tverdokhlebov (1987–1993)
 Semyon Vaskov (1993–2002)
 Anatoly Shalagin (2002–2017)
 Sergey Babin (since 2018)

External links
 Институт автоматики и электрометрии СО РАН. ГПНТБ. Institute of Automation and Electrometry of SB RAS. SPSTL SB RAS.
 Полюс холода в Сибири. Наука в Сибири. Pole of cold in Siberia. Nauka v Sibiri. April 21, 2016.

Research institutes in Novosibirsk
Research institutes established in 1957
1957 establishments in the Soviet Union
Research institutes in the Soviet Union